Yoshiyuki Shirate (born 21 March 1947) is a Japanese biathlete. He competed in the relay event at the 1976 Winter Olympics.

References

1947 births
Living people
Japanese male biathletes
Olympic biathletes of Japan
Biathletes at the 1976 Winter Olympics
Sportspeople from Hokkaido